The Lights o' London is a melodramatic play, by George R. Sims, first produced in London on 10 September 1881 at the Princess's Theatre, produced by and starring Wilson Barrett.  The play was a hit, running for 226 nights, and was frequently revived thereafter. It also opened in New York at the Union Square Theatre in December 1881 and was revived twice on Broadway.

The play was twice made into silent films, both titled Lights of London, in 1914, directed by Bert Haldane and 1923, directed by Charles Calvert.

Synopsis
Harold Armytage and Bess Marks elope.  Harold's father is rich but after the elopement disowns him.  Clifford Armytage, Harold's scheming cousin, and Seth Preene, a friend of Harold's father, frame innocent Harold for a crime so that Clifford will inherit the father's money instead of Harold. Seth aids Clifford because he hopes that his daughter, Hetty (who declares "I hate poor people"), would then marry Clifford and become rich. Harold is convicted and sentenced to gaol but escapes and is helped by an elderly couple to find Bess again.  Meanwhile, Seth visits Hetty in London.  She has become Clifford's mistress.  After Harold rescues Seth from drowning, Seth decides to confess his crime so Harold will receive his inheritance and Clifford will get the punishment he deserves.

Roles and original cast
Harold Armytage – Wilson Barrett
Clifford Armytage – E. S. Willard
Seth Preene – Walter Speakman
Jarvis – George Barrett
Philosopher Jack – Charles Coote
Irish Policeman – Barney Cullen
Aubrey De Vere, Esq. – Arthur Scott
Bess Marks – Miss Eastlake
Hetty Preene – Emeline Ormsby
Mrs. Jarvis – Mrs. Stephens
Shakespeare Jarvis – Eugene Edwards

References
Notes

External links
The Lights o'London at the IBDB Broadway database
Theatre poster from a revival
IMDb article on the 1922 film version

1881 plays
English plays
British plays adapted into films